Idaho Legislative District 33 is one of 35 districts of the Idaho Legislature. It is currently represented by Senator Dave Lent, Republican  of Idaho Falls, Representative Barbara Ehardt, Republican of Idaho Falls, and Representative Bryan Zollinger, Republican of Idaho Falls.

District profile (1992–2002) 
From 1992 to 2002, District 33 consisted of a portion of Bannock County.

District profile (2002–2012) 
From 2002 to 2012, District 33 consisted of a portion of Bonneville County.

District profile (2012–present) 
District 33 currently consists of a portion of Bonneville County.

See also

 List of Idaho Senators
 List of Idaho State Representatives

References

External links
Idaho Legislative District Map (with members)
Idaho Legislature (official site)

33
Bonneville County, Idaho